Sarstedt is a railway station located in Sarstedt, Germany. The station is located on the Hanoverian Southern Railway. The train services are operated by Deutsche Bahn, Metronom and Erixx. The station is also served by the Hanover S-Bahn.

Train services
The following services currently call at the station:

Regional services  Uelzen - Celle - Hannover - Barnten - Elze - Kreiensen - Northeim - Göttingen
Regional services  Hannover - Hildesheim - Goslar - Bad Harzburg
Hannover S-Bahn services  Bennemühlen - Langenhagen - Hannover - Hannover Messe/Laatzen - Hildesheim

References

External links
 

Railway stations in Lower Saxony
Hannover S-Bahn stations
Buildings and structures in Hildesheim (district)